Time Crashers is a British entertainment television programme co-produced by Wall to Wall Media and GroupM Entertainment for Channel 4. The programme's format sees ten celebrities transported to different historical settings where they experience the life of the 'lower' classes and are set tasks relating to that era. It is presented by Tony Robinson and historian Cassie Newland.

The first series premiered on Channel 4 on 23 August 2015. The series contained six episodes that were broadcast on consecutive Sundays at 8pm for six weeks.

Production 
The production of the first series of Time Crashers was announced by Channel 4 in August 2014. It was initially described being a week-long celebrity game show with an ultimate winner crowned at the end of the series. By August 2015, Channel 4 described the programme's genre as "entertainment" and the competitive game show element was dropped. Instead, each episode would feature historical "tasks" for the celebrities to fulfil.

In production, the Channel 4 factual commissioning department worked alongside the entertainment team to make sure the programme was historically accurate.

Participants

The following individuals were the participants in the premier run of the show:

 Keith Allen
 Kirstie Alley
 Fern Britton 
 Charlie Condou
 Meg Mathews
 Jermaine Jenas
 Louise Minchin
 Chris Ramsey 
 Greg Rutherford
 Zoe Smith

Episodes 
Each episode focuses on a different period in British history.

Series 1

Reception 
The first episode of Time Crashers attracted 1.33 million viewers on the Channel 4 HD and SD channels. The second episode attracted 730,000 viewers, and each subsequent episode attracted fewer than 790,000 viewers.

Julia Raeside of The Guardian positively reviewed the first episode and described it as "simple entertainment perfection". She also praised the casting as "outstanding [...] These are proper people all and quite the mix." Amy Burns of The Independent also gave a positive review of the first episode, calling the programme's format "truly engaging".

Michael Hogan of The Telegraph gave the first episode two out of five stars, saying the programme "wasn’t educational, nor entertaining, and felt stitched together for novelty value".

Time Crashers was featured in Series 6 Episode 1 of the Channel 4 reality show Gogglebox.

References

External links
 
 

2015 British television series debuts
2015 British television series endings
2010s British reality television series
Channel 4 reality television shows
English-language television shows
Historical reality television series